Dyneley Hussey (27 February 1893 – 6 September 1972) was an English war poet, journalist, art critic and music critic.

Life

Hussey was born in India and was the son of Colonel Charles Edward Hussey. He was educated at St Cyprian's School Eastbourne, The King's School Canterbury and Corpus Christi College, Oxford. He served in World War I as a lieutenant in the Thirteenth Battalion of the Lancashire Fusiliers, and published a book of war poems. Two of his most celebrated war poems are "An Oxford Retrospect" and "Courage". He then spent five years in the finance department at the Admiralty.

He became an author and journalist and in 1923 was writing art criticism. However his main interest was music and he wrote several works on opera. He was music critic for The Times from 1923 to 1946 and also wrote successively for the Saturday Review, Weekend Review, and Spectator. During World War II he again took on an administrative post at the Admiralty. In 1946, he was chosen to deal with music on the BBC Third Programme and became music critic of The Listener, remaining until 1960. He wrote several articles for the Musical Times under the title "The Musician's Gramophone".

Hussey married Irene Duncan in 1926 and had a son and two daughters. She died in 1941 and he subsequently married Dr. Florence Costello. He died at Cheltenham aged 79.

Works

Fleur de Lys (war poems)
Eurydice or the Nature of Opera
George Clausen (1923)
Wolfgang Amadeus Mozart (1928)
Verdi (1940 and 1968)
Some Composers of Opera (1952)

References

1893 births
1972 deaths
Lancashire Fusiliers officers
British Army personnel of World War I
People educated at The King's School, Canterbury
People educated at St Cyprian's School
Alumni of Corpus Christi College, Oxford
English music critics
English art critics
Opera critics
English World War I poets
English journalists
Classical music critics
Place of birth missing
British people in colonial India